

Biography
Henri of Savoy (2 November 157210 July 1632), called originally Marquis de Saint-Sorlin, was the son of Jacques of Savoy and Anna d'Este, the widow of François de Lorraine, Duke of Guise. He succeeded his brother Charles Emmanuel as Duke of Nemours.

In 1588 he took the marquisate of Saluzzo from the French for his cousin, the Duke of Savoy. The princes of Guise, his half-brothers, induced him to join the League, and in 1591 he was made governor of Dauphiné in the name of that faction. He made his submission to Henry IV in 1596. After quarrelling with the duke of Savoy he withdrew to Burgundy and joined the Spaniards in their war against Savoy. After peace had been proclaimed on November 14, 1616, he retired to the French court.

After his death, he was succeeded by his eldest son, Louis; on the death of Louis in 1641 by his second son Charles Amadeus; and on Charles's death in 1651 by his third son Henri.  All three were the sons of his wife Anne de Lorraine (1600–1638), daughter of Charles de Lorraine, Duke of Aumale.

References

Sources

Nemours, Henri de Savoie, 4th duc de
Nemours, Henri de Savoie, 4th duc de
Dukes of Nemours
Counts of Geneva
Princes of Savoy